The 1957 Iowa State Cyclones baseball team represented Iowa State University in the 1957 NCAA University Division baseball season.  The team was coached by Cap Timm in his 16th year as head coach at Iowa State.

The Cyclones won the District V playoff to advance to the College World Series, where they were defeated by the California Golden Bears.

Roster

Schedule

|-
! style="" | Regular Season
|-

|-
! bgcolor="#DDDDFF" width="3%" | #
! bgcolor="#DDDDFF" width="7%" | Date
! bgcolor="#DDDDFF" width="14%" | Opponent
! bgcolor="#DDDDFF" width="25%" | Site/Stadium
! bgcolor="#DDDDFF" width="5%" | Score
! bgcolor="#DDDDFF" width="5%" | Overall Record
! bgcolor="#DDDDFF" width="5%" | Big 7 Record
|- align="center" bgcolor="#ccffcc"
| 1 || April 6 || vs  || Unknown • Unknown || 11–0 || 1–0 || – 
|- align="center" bgcolor="#ccffcc"
| 2 || April 6 || vs Iowa State Teachers || Unknown • Unknown || 13–2 || 2–0 || –
|- align="center" bgcolor="#ccffcc"
| 3 || April 13 || vs  || Unknown • Unknown || 14–10 || 3–0 || –
|- align="center" bgcolor="#ffcccc"
| 4 || April 13 || vs Minnesota || Unknown • Unknown || 10–11 || 3–1 || –
|- align="center" bgcolor="#ccffcc"
| 5 || April 19 || Missouri || Unknown • Ames, Iowa || 14–9 || 4–1 || 1–0
|- align="center" bgcolor="#ccffcc"
| 6 || April 20 || Missouri || Unknown • Ames, Iowa || 6–5 || 5–1 || 2–0
|- align="center" bgcolor="#ffcccc"
| 7 || April 20 || Missouri || Unknown • Ames, Iowa || 3–7 || 5–2 || 2–1
|- align="center" bgcolor="#ccffcc"
| 8 || April 26 || at  || Husker Diamond • Lincoln, Nebraska || 5–0|| 6–2 || 3–1
|- align="center" bgcolor="#ffcccc"
| 9 || April 27 || at Nebraska || Husker Diamond • Lincoln, Nebraska || 5–10 || 6–3 || 3–2
|- align="center" bgcolor="#ffcccc"
| 10 || April 27 || at Nebraska || Husker Diamond • Lincoln, Nebraska || 3–4 || 6–4 || 3–3
|-

|-
! bgcolor="#DDDDFF" width="3%" | #
! bgcolor="#DDDDFF" width="7%" | Date
! bgcolor="#DDDDFF" width="14%" | Opponent
! bgcolor="#DDDDFF" width="25%" | Site/Stadium
! bgcolor="#DDDDFF" width="5%" | Score
! bgcolor="#DDDDFF" width="5%" | Overall Record
! bgcolor="#DDDDFF" width="5%" | Big 7 Record
|- align="center" bgcolor="#ccffcc"
| 11 || May 4 ||  || Unknown • Ames, Iowa || 7–1 || 7–4 || 4–3
|- align="center" bgcolor="#ffcccc"
| 12 || May 5 || Oklahoma || Unknown • Ames, Iowa || 4–6 || 7–5 || 4–4
|- align="center" bgcolor="#ccffcc"
| 13 || May 5 || Oklahoma || Unknown • Ames, Iowa || 3–2 || 8–5 || 5–4
|- align="center" bgcolor="#ccffcc"
| 14 || May 11 || at  || Unknown • Manhattan, Kansas || 13–2 || 9–5 || 6–4
|- align="center" bgcolor="#ccffcc"
| 15 || May 11 || at Kansas State || Unknown • Manhattan, Kansas || 12–7 || 10–5 || 7–4
|- align="center" bgcolor="#ccffcc"
| 16 || May 17 ||  || Unknown • Ames, Iowa || 7–2 || 11–5 || 8–4
|- align="center" bgcolor="#ccffcc"
| 17 || May 18 || Kansas || Unknown • Ames, Iowa || 12–0 || 12–5 || 9–4
|- align="center" bgcolor="#ccffcc"
| 18 || May 18 || Kansas || Unknown • Ames, Iowa || 4–0 || 13–5 || 10–4
|- align="center" bgcolor="#ccffcc"
| 19 || May 24 || at  || Unknown • Boulder, Colorado || 13–4 || 14–5 || 11–4
|- align="center" bgcolor="#ffcccc"
| 20 || May 25 || at Colorado || Unknown • Boulder, Colorado || 7–8 || 14–6 || 11–5
|- align="center" bgcolor="#ffcccc"
| 21 || May 25 || at Colorado || Unknown • Boulder, Colorado || 10–12 || 14–7 || 11–6
|-

|-
! style="" | Postseason
|-

|-
! bgcolor="#DDDDFF" width="3%" | #
! bgcolor="#DDDDFF" width="7%" | Date
! bgcolor="#DDDDFF" width="14%" | Opponent
! bgcolor="#DDDDFF" width="25%" | Site/Stadium
! bgcolor="#DDDDFF" width="5%" | Score
! bgcolor="#DDDDFF" width="5%" | Overall Record
! bgcolor="#DDDDFF" width="5%" | Big 7 Record
|- align="center" bgcolor="#ccffcc"
| 22 || May 31 ||  || Unknown • Ames, Iowa || 2–0 || 15–7 || 11–6
|- align="center" bgcolor="#ccffcc"
| 23 || June 1 || Bradley || Unknown • Ames, Iowa || 3–0 || 16–7 || 11–6
|-

|-
! bgcolor="#DDDDFF" width="3%" | #
! bgcolor="#DDDDFF" width="7%" | Date
! bgcolor="#DDDDFF" width="14%" | Opponent
! bgcolor="#DDDDFF" width="25%" | Site/Stadium
! bgcolor="#DDDDFF" width="5%" | Score
! bgcolor="#DDDDFF" width="5%" | Overall Record
! bgcolor="#DDDDFF" width="5%" | Big 7 Record
|- align="center" bgcolor="#ccffcc"
| 24 || June 8 || vs Notre Dame || Omaha Municipal Stadium • Omaha, Nebraska || 13–8 || 17–7 || 11–6
|- align="center" bgcolor="#ffcccc"
| 25 || June 9 || vs California || Omaha Municipal Stadium • Omaha, Nebraska || 2–8 || 17–8 || 11–6
|- align="center" bgcolor="#ccffcc"
| 26 || June 10 || vs Connecticut || Omaha Municipal Stadium • Omaha, Nebraska || 5–2 || 18–8 || 11–6
|- align="center" bgcolor="#ffcccc"
| 27 || June 11 || vs California || Omaha Municipal Stadium • Omaha, Nebraska || 1–9 || 18–9 || 11–6
|-

|-
|

Awards and honors 
Dick Bertell
Second Team All-American Sports Illustrated

Gary Thompson
Third Team All-American Sports Illustrated

References

Iowa State Cyclones baseball seasons
Iowa State Cyclones baseball
College World Series seasons
Iowa State
Big Eight Conference baseball champion seasons